Sir Chichester Fortescue (7 June 1750 – 22 March 1820) was an Irish admiral and member of parliament.

The son of Chichester Fortescue by his wife Elizabeth, daughter of Richard Wesley, 1st Baron Mornington (through whom he was a first cousin of Arthur Wellesley, 1st Duke of Wellington), he represented Trim in the Irish House of Commons from 1798 to the Act of Union 1800. He also served as Ulster King of Arms, succeeding his younger brother Gerald in 1788, and was knighted on 21 February that year by the Lord Lieutenant, Lord Buckingham.

His daughter Frances married George Hamilton, as his second wife.

References

1750 births
1820 deaths
Chichester
Irish MPs 1798–1800
Members of the Parliament of Ireland (pre-1801) for County Meath constituencies